Saint Petersburg was constructed in 1703. The first hotel was built in 1719 on a place of Chicherin House in a Nevsky Prospekt 15. It was a Gostiny Dvor, a gallery where merchants lived, stored the goods and traded in them.

The first modern hotel was opened in 1804 on Bolshaya Morskaya street 23/8. It was called the "Big hotel Paris". In 1821, regulations governing "hotels, restaurants, coffee houses, and taverns" were introduced.

See also
List of buildings and structures in Saint Petersburg

References